Viticuso is a comune (municipality) in the Province of Frosinone in the Italian region Lazio, located about  southeast of Rome and about  east of Frosinone.

Viticuso borders the following municipalities: Acquafondata, Cervaro, Conca Casale, Pozzilli, San Vittore del Lazio, Vallerotonda.

References

External links
 Official website

Cities and towns in Lazio